Sol Hachuel (spelt "Solica Hatchouel" on her tombstone, see photo, Tangier 1817–5 June 1834, Fez) was a Moroccan Jewish heroine who was publicly decapitated when she was 17 years old. She was executed in 1834 for alleged apostasy from Islam—apparently without ever having converted to Islam. According to The Jewish Encyclopedia Hachuel "was a martyr to her faith, preferring death to becoming the bride of the sultan." She is considered a tzadeket (saint) by some Jews and is also revered by some Muslims. Jews call her Sol HaTzaddikah ("the righteous Sol"), while Arabs call her Lalla Suleika ("holy lady Suleika").

Hachuel's sacrifice served as an inspiration to painters and writers. One of the most detailed accounts, based on interviews with eyewitnesses, was written by Eugenio Maria Romero. His book El Martirio de la Jóven Hachuel, ó, La Heroina Hebrea (The Martyrdom of the Young Hachuel, or, The Hebrew Heroine) was first published in 1837 and republished in 1838. Hachuel's story was also the subject of a song by Françoise Atlan on the CD Romances Sefardies.

In the 1860s, the French artist Alfred Dehodencq painted multiple versions of a work depicting the execution of a Jewish woman in Morocco; one of these paintings was exhibited at the Paris Salon of 1861 under the title Exécution d’une juive, au Maroc. Some scholars say that Dejodencq was inspired by the story of Sol Hacueul, but the artist's friend and biographer, states explicitly, in more than one book, that Dehodencq was an eye-witness to the execution he depicted, which took place in Tangiers.

Life
Hachuel was born in 1817 in Morocco, to Chaim and Simcha Hachuel, and had one older brother. Her father was a merchant and Talmudist. He conducted a study group in his home, which helped Sol form and maintain her own belief in Judaism. Sol's mother was a housewife.

Allegations of conversion to Islam
According to the account of Israel Joseph Benjamin, a Jewish explorer who visited Morocco in the middle of the 19th century, "never had the sun of Africa shone on more perfect beauty" than Hachuel. Benjamin wrote that her Muslim neighbors said that "It is a sin that such a pearl should be in the possession of the Jews, and it would be a crime to leave them such a jewel."

According to Eugenio Maria Romero's account, Tahra de Mesoodi, a devout Muslim girl and Hachuel's friend and neighbor, falsely claimed she converted Hachuel to Islam; obtaining a convert is considered a particularly pious deed according to the Maliki madhhab.

Arrest and execution
Based on a single and probably false claim of her conversion to Islam, Hachuel was brought to the court and told to kneel before the governor. If she promised to convert, she was promised protection from her parents, silk and gold, and marriage to a handsome young man. If she did not convert, the pasha threatened her as follows:

The girl responded:

True to his promise, the pasha imprisoned Sol in a windowless and lightless cell with chains around her neck, hands, and feet. Her parents appealed to the Spanish vice-consul, Don José Rico, for help. He did what he could to free the girl, but his efforts were unsuccessful.

The pasha sent Hachuel to Fez, where the sultan would decide her fate. The fee for her transfer (and eventual execution) was to be paid by her father, who was threatened with 500 blows of the bastinado if he did not comply. Eventually, Don José Rico paid the required sum because Sol's father could not afford it.

In Fez, the Sultan appointed the Qadi to decide Sol's punishment. The Qadi summoned the Jewish sages of Fez and told them that unless Sol converted, she would be beheaded and the community punished. Although the hakhamim urged her to convert to save herself and their community, she refused. She was convicted and sentenced to death, and the Qadi ruled that her father would bear the cost of her burial. The sultan's son, astonished by Sol's beauty, also tried to convince her to convert to Islam. She refused.

Sol was beheaded in a public square in Fez. Romero described the emotions of the citizens of Fez on the day of the execution: "The Moors, whose religious fanaticism is indescribable, prepared, with their accustomed joy, to witness the horrid scene. The Jews of the city...were moved with the deepest sorrow, but they could do nothing to avert it[.]"

Apparently the sultan instructed the executioner to wound Sol first, hoping that the sight of her own blood would frighten her into accepting conversion. But Sol remained steadfast.

The Jewish community of Fez was awestruck by Hachuel's heroism. They had to pay for the retrieval of her corpse, her head and the bloodstained earth for a Jewish burial at the Jewish cemetery. She was declared a martyr.

The Jews called Hachuel "Sol ha-Tzaddikah" (The righteous Sol), and the Arabs called her Lalla Suleika (the holy lady Suleika). Her grave became a place of pilgrimage for both Jews and Muslims alike.
While it might seem strange that Moroccan Muslims consider the girl to be their saint, Léon Godard explains the custom in his Description et histoire du Maroc:

Her headstone has inscriptions in both Hebrew and French. The French text reads, "Here rests Mademoiselle Solica Hachuel born in Tangier in 1817 refusing to enter into [or 're-enter'; the French text reads rentrer] the Islamic religion. The Arabs murdered her in 1834 in Fez, while she was torn away from her family. The entire world mourns this saintly child."

References

Citations

Sources

External links

1817 births
1834 deaths
19th-century Moroccan Jews
Jewish Moroccan history
Executed Moroccan people
Apostasy in Islam
Islamic criminal jurisprudence
Islam-related controversies
Jewish martyrs
People from Tangier
Antisemitism in Morocco
People executed by Morocco by decapitation
People executed for refusing to convert to Islam